Richard C. Bush III is an American expert on China affairs. Since 2002, he has served as the director of Center for Northeast Asian Policy Studies (CNAPS) of the Brookings Institution, and concurrently as the inaugural Michael H. Armacost Chair in Foreign Policy Studies. Bush is also a senior fellow of foreign policy.

Education 
Richard Bush received his undergraduate education at Lawrence University in Appleton, Wisconsin. 
He did his graduate work in political science at Columbia University, getting an M.A. in 1973 and his Ph.D. in 1978. His thesis in political science concentrated on studies about China-Taiwan relations, U.S.-China relations, the Korean peninsula and Japan's security.

Career 
Richard Bush began his career in 1977 with the China Council of The Asia Society. 

In 1983 he became a staff consultant on the House Foreign Affairs Committee's Subcommittee on Asian and Pacific Affairs. 
In 1993 he moved up to the full committee, where he worked on Asia issues and served as liaison with Democratic members. 
In 1995, he became national intelligence officer for East Asia and a member of the National Intelligence Council (NIC), which coordinates the analytic work of the intelligence community. 
He left the NIC in 1997 to become head of the American Institute in Taiwan.
He has served in the executive and legislative branches of U. S. government for 19 years, including those of National Intelligence Officer for East Asia and Chairman of the board of the American Institute in Taiwan (1997-2002), and is still active in observing international affairs in East Asia.

Publications 
He published At Cross Purposes: U.S.-Taiwan Relations since 1942 in 2004, Untying the Knot in 2006, A War Like No Other: The Truth About China's Challenge to America  in 2007, and The Perils of Proximity: China-Japan Security Relations in 2010. His latest work,  Hong Kong in the Shadow of China: Living With the Leviathan was published in 2016.

Bibliography

References

External links

Columbia Graduate School of Arts and Sciences alumni
Lawrence University alumni
American political scientists
American political writers
American male non-fiction writers
Living people
Chairs of the American Institute in Taiwan
Year of birth missing (living people)